The 1948 Michigan State Spartans football team represented Michigan State College as an independent the 1948 college football season. In their second season under head coach Clarence Munn, the Spartans compiled a 6–2–2 record and were ranked No. 14 in the final AP Poll.

Two Spartans received second-team honors on the 1948 College Football All-America Team. Guard Don Mason received second-team honors from the Associated Press, and end Warren Huey received second-team honors from the Football Writers Association of America.

The 1948 Spartans sustained their two losses in annual rivalry games against Notre Dame (26–7) and national champion Michigan (13–7). In intersectional play, the Spartans beat Hawaii (68–21), Arizona (61–7), Oregon State (46–21), and Washington State (40–0), and tied with Penn State (14–14) and Santa Clara (21–21).

Schedule

Game summaries

Michigan

Michigan State opened it 1948 season with a 13–7 loss to Michigan in East Lansing. The game was also the first to be played at Michigan State's new Macklin Stadium. Early in the opening quarter, fullback Don Peterson threw a 40-yard touchdown pass to Dick Rifenburg. Peterson kicked the extra point, and Michigan's 7–0 lead held through halftime. Michigan State tied the game in the third quarter on a disputed play in which a pass from Lynn Chandnois was caught by both Hank Minarik and Wally Teninga. The official ruled that possession went to the offensive player as a touchdown. Peterson scored the winning touchdown for Michigan on a five-yard run in the fourth quarter, but failed to convert the extra point attempt. Late in the fourth quarter, Michigan State drove the ball to Michigan's two-yard line. With time running out, Teninga intercepted a Michigan State pass. Michigan's offense was held to 106 rushing yards and 117 passing yards in the game.

A sluggish offensive performance and a narrow margin of victory over a team the Wolverines had beaten 55–0 in 1947 led some in the media to question Oosterbaan's selection as Michigan's new coach. The New York Times opined that Michigan's performance "lacked most of the precision which it had last year under H. O. Crisler." H. G. Salsinger of The Detroit News wrote:"Michigan's first game under Oosterbaan . . . was not impressive. They lacked the spark that distinguished them through the 1947 season. The offense was dull and poorly directed . . . . The critics who had judged Oosterbaan's football coaching skills on his record as a basketball coach considered their appraisal justified. The future looked dark for Michigan and Oosterbaan."

Opinions of Oosterbaan changed as Michigan shut out ranked opponents in each of the next three games.

References

Michigan State
Michigan State Spartans football seasons
Michigan State Spartans football